Montaulin is a commune in the Aube department in north-central France.

Geography
The Barse flows through the commune.

Population
The inhabitants of the town of Montaulin are Montaulinois.

See also
Communes of the Aube department

References

Communes of Aube
Aube communes articles needing translation from French Wikipedia